Pra Brilhar is the fifth studio album by Brazilian pop singer Kelly Key, released on 20 September 2008, by Som Livre.

Track listing

References

2008 albums
Kelly Key albums